I Wanna Love You may refer to:
 "I Wanna Love You" (Akon song), 2006
 "I Wanna Love You" (Jade song), 1992
 "I Wanna Love You", a song by Estelle from The 18th Day
 "I Wanna Love You", a song by Solid HarmoniE from Solid HarmoniE